Radovan Pavlik (born February 18, 1998) is a Czech ice hockey player. He is currently playing with Mountfield HK of the Czech Extraliga.

Pavlik made his Czech Extraliga debut playing with Mountfield HK during the 2014–15 Czech Extraliga season.

References

External links
 
 

1998 births
Living people
Czech ice hockey forwards
Stadion Hradec Králové players
Sportspeople from Hradec Králové